is a railway line in Okayama Prefecture, Japan, operated by the West Japan Railway Company (JR West).

Stations
All stations are in Okayama Prefecture.

Rolling stock
 KiHa 40 series diesel multiple units

History
The line opened in 1904.  The line is named after the historical Kibi Province.

On 1 June 1944, the Chugoku Railway was nationalized, becoming part of Japanese National Railways (JNR). With the privatization of JNR on 1 April 1987, the line came under the control of JR West.

Leading on from this is the linguistic / phonetic coincidence that "kibi dango" (millet dumplings) is a famous dish associated with the Momotaro legend despite neither the character, nor millet in general, nor millet dumplings specifically have any particular historical connection to Okayama.  The coincidence has been commented on for centuries.

See also
 List of railway lines in Japan

References

 
Rail transport in Okayama Prefecture
Lines of West Japan Railway Company
1067 mm gauge railways in Japan
Railway lines opened in 1904
1904 establishments in Japan